 
There are a number of castles in West Lothian, Scotland. They range from medieval mottes, through tower houses and Renaissance laird's houses, to relatively modern castellated mansions.

Many of the earliest castles are long since abandoned, and are either visible as earthworks, or only known from historical record. Later medieval and early modern buildings are often ruined, though several have been restored from a ruinous condition. Among those which have been continuously occupied are Bridge, Ochiltree and House of the Binns. Also within West Lothian is the ruined royal palace of Linlithgow, built on the site of an earlier fortification, but elaborated as one of the principal royal residences of the Scottish monarchy.

The council area of West Lothian lies to the west of Edinburgh, south of the Firth of Forth. The area differs from the historical county of West Lothian (Linlithgowshire): it includes castles which were formerly in Midlothian (e.g. Cairns Castle), and excludes others which were in West Lothian but now lie in Edinburgh (e.g. Dundas Castle).

List of castles

See also
Castles in Scotland
List of castles in Scotland
List of listed buildings in West Lothian

Notes

External links

 Castles and historic houses, West Lothian Council

 
West Lothian